Vadia is a village in Banaskantha district in the Indian state of Gujarat.

Historically, unmarried women of this village supported themselves through prostitution, with the men of the village working as pimps.

Efforts are underway to change this state of affairs, by such organizations as Vicharta Samuday Samarthan Manch.

References

Villages in Banaskantha district